Davlyatovka (Däwlät) is a rural locality (a village) in Karaidelsky Selsoviet, Karaidelsky District, Bashkortostan, Russia. The population was 27 as of 2010. There is 1 street.

Geography 
Davlyatovka is located 25 km northwest of Karaidel (the district's administrative centre) by road. Malikovo is the nearest rural locality.

References 

Rural localities in Karaidelsky District